This article deals in more detail with some of the notable synagogues of Jerusalem that do not have their own page as yet.

Former synagogues
 Beis Aharon Synagogue of Karlin-Stolin

In around 1870 the first Karlin-Stolin Hasidim settled in Jerusalem and by 1874 had established their own synagogue in the Old City. It was named Beis Aharon (House of Aaron) after a work authored by Rabbi Aharon II Perlow of Karlin (1802–1872).

After it was destroyed during the 1948 1948 Arab–Israeli War, a new centre was established in Jerusalem's Beis Yisrael neighbourhood.

 Chesed El Synagogue, a synagogue located on Chabad Street in the Jewish Quarter of the Old City of Jerusalem. It was established by immigrants from Iraq in 1853 and served as a centre for Jews of Iraqi descent living in Jerusalem. It also served as a yeshiva for kabbalists and had a famous library of Kabbalistic works.

The synagogue was active until the fall of the Jewish Quarter during the 1948 Arab–Israeli War when it was taken over by an Arab family. After the Six-Day War the building became the centre of Bnei Akiva and didn't revert to use as a synagogue.

 "Tiferet Yisrael Synagogue" has been destroyed in 1948, but, as of 2019, is in the process of being rebuilt, much like the Hurva Synagogue.

 Yanina Synagogue, a Romaniote synagogue established by the Jews of Ioannina, Greece. It was located in the Christian Quarter of the Old City of Jerusalem. The community also has a synagogue in the "new city", located in the Ohel Moshe neighborhood of Nahlaot.

Active synagogues

Old City – Armenian Quarter

Orthodox Judaism
Ari Synagogue
Ohr ha-Chaim Synagogue

Old City – Jewish Quarter
Karaite Judaism
 Karaite Synagogue, founded by Anan Ben David, the founder of the Karaites, is the oldest synagogue in the Jewish Quarter.

Orthodox Judaism

Beit El Synagogues: there are two with this name in Jerusalem, along with the Yeshivat HaMekubalim school of Kabbalah. One is located in the Jewish Quarter, but another one, continuing the same pre-1948 tradition and functioning under the same name (Beit El Synagogue and Yeshivat HaMekubalim), is located in the Ruhama neighbourhood of West Jerusalem.
 Four Sephardic Synagogues:
Yochanan ben Zakai Synagogue, also Rabban Yochanan ben Zakai Synagogue and Kahal Kadosh Gadol
Istanbuli Synagogue
Eliahu Ha'navi Synagogue, aka Kahal Talmud Torah
Emtsai or Middle Synagogue, aka Kahal Tzion Synagogue
 Hurva Synagogue (English: Ruined Synagogue) is the currently largest synagogue in the Jewish Quarter. It was originally intended for construction in the 18th century.  A small building was constructed, but due to financial difficulties, the intended larger building was not completed. The building was destroyed by an earthquake, and a second attempt to build a large synagogue was blocked by Arab landowners in the early 19th century failed. In the 1830s, multiple small synagogues were built around the site. In the 1860s, the large synagogue was completed. It was destroyed by the Jordanians following the 1947–1949 Palestine war. The synagogue was rebuilt in 2010 and is a distinguished feature of Jerusalem's Old City skyline.
 Menachem Zion Synagogue, completed in 1837. Built by the Perushim, it was named after their leader Rabbi Menachem Mendel of Shklov and after the blessing of consolation recited on Tisha B'Av: "Blessed be He who consoles (menachem) Zion and rebuilds Jerusalem." Rabbi Daniel Sperber leads the congregation.
Ramban Synagogue, the oldest Rabbinic synagogue of the Jewish Quarter
 Tzemach Tzedek Synagogue
 Tzuf Dvash Synagogue, a Sephardic synagogue which was founded in 1860 
Western Wall, the holiest Jewish site alongside the Temple Mount, functions as a synagogue including the area beneath Wilson's Arch.

Old City – Muslim Quarter

Orthodox Judaism
 Ohel Yitzchak Synagogue, former Shomrei HaChomos Synagogue or Ungarin Shul (Hungarian synagogue), Muslim Quarter of the Old City
 Igud Lohamay Jerushalaim Ateret Cohanim, (in Hebrew בית הכנסת איגוד לוחמי ירושלים וישיבת עטרת ירושלים}, Muslim Quarter of the Old City

New City

Orthodox Judaism

 Ades Synagogue, also known as the Great Synagogue Ades of the Glorious Aleppo Community, located in Nachlaot neighborhood, was established by Syrian immigrants in 1901.
 Baka Chabad Center for the English Speaking
 Beis Hamedrash Gur, Geula
 Beit El Synagogue in Ruhama neighbourhood: see sister synagogue in the Old City for details.
 Belz Great Synagogue (Belz Beis HaMedrash HaGadol) in the Kiryat Belz neighbourhood
 Chanichei Yeshivos, Romema
 David's Tomb
 Great Synagogue, on King George Street in central Jerusalem
 HaNassi Synagogue, Rehavia
 HaTzvi Yisrael Synagogue, Talbieh
 Hecht Synagogue, Hebrew University, Mount Scopus Campus
 Heichal Shlomo with its Renanim Synagogue transferred from Padua; King George Street
 Israel Goldstein Synagogue, Givat Ram campus, Hebrew University
 Italian Synagogue, Hillel Street
 Kehilas Bnei Torah, Har Nof
 Or Zaruaa Synagogue, Jerusalem, Israel, Nahlat Ahim neighbourhood, part of Nachlaot
 Shai Agnon Synagogue, Talpiot. The full official Hebrew name is Beth Midrash "Tiferet Yisrael" al Shem Shai Agnon", lit. "House of Learning 'Glory of Israel' in the name of S. Y. Agnon".
 Zoharei Chama Synagogue, on Jaffa Road

The Talpiot neighborhood in Jerusalem was established immediately after World War I. Its planners' intention was to make it into the capital city of the nascent State of Israel. The first synagogue in the neighbourhood was in a hut, which was established to serve as a structure for the builders of the neighbourhood and after the completion of the construction was converted into a mixed Ashkenazi and Sephardic synagogue. Among the first worshipers of the minyan in the hut was the writer Shmuel Yosef Agnon, who lived in the neighbourhood. He described the hut and how the prayer was conducted in it in the short story "The Symbol" (The Fire and the Trees), Tel Aviv Press 1961. The cornerstone of the current building was laid in Chanukah 1934, in the presence of Rabbi Avraham Yitzhak HaCohen Kook. With the outbreak of the 1936–1939 riots, the construction of the synagogue was delayed and the structure remained neglected. After the outbreak of World War II in 1939 the British confiscated the building and established in it a police station and a warehouse.

After the establishment of the State of Israel in 1948, during the period when Talpiot was a transit camp (ma'abara), the State used the building as a warehouse of equipment for the transit camp. In the 1950s the building was leased to the Hebrew University and served as a warehouse of its medical school. In the late 1960s the building returned to the Jerusalem municipality, who renovated the building with the assistance of the Jerusalem Foundation and with a contribution received from author S. Y. Agnon, a resident of the neighbourhood, out of the money he received for the Nobel Prize. In the month of Elul 5772 (1972) the synagogue was again inaugurated in a procession where the Torah scrolls from the hut were brought in.
 Yad Tamar Synagogue, Rehavia
 Yakar Synagogue, Old Katamon neighborhood, including the Yakar Center for Social Concern and the Center for Arts and Creativity—Anglo and Israeli congregation
 Yeshurun Synagogue, King George Street

Conservative Judaism
 Conservative Yeshiva
 Schechter Institute of Jewish Studies

Reconstructionist Judaism
 Mevakshay Derekh, Shai Agnon Street

Reform Judaism
 Hebrew Union College, King David Street
 Kehillat Har-El, the first Reform synagogue in Jerusalem, on Shmuel haNagid Street
 Kehillat Kol HaNeshama, Reform synagogue in the Baka neighbourhood
 Kehillat Mevakshei Derech, Reform synagogue in the San Simon neighbourhood

References

 
Late modern history of Jerusalem
Former buildings and structures in Jerusalem